Wadsa railway station serves Desaiganj in Gadchiroli district of Maharashtra state in India. Its Station Code is WSA.

References

Railway stations in Maharashtra